In 1977 the British Lions rugby union team toured New Zealand. The Lions played 26 matches, including four internationals against the All Blacks. They lost the series against the All Blacks by three matches to one. The team played as the British Isles in their internationals against the All Blacks and the British Lions for the non-international games. Unlike all previous tours to New Zealand, the Lions did not play any matches in Australia, though one game was also played at Buckhurst Park, Suva, against Fiji.

The Lions tourists left London on 10 May 1977 and returned on 19 August. Of their 26 matches on tour, they won 21 and lost 5. Although the Lions lost the test series against the All Blacks they were level 1–1 after the second international and came close to drawing the series; they led 9–6 going into injury time in the fourth test only to concede a match-winning try scored by Lawrie Knight.

Outside the test series, the Lions beat all their New Zealand provincial opponents as well as the NZ Maori and NZ Juniors representative teams, losing only to the New Zealand Universities team four days before the first international – this was the first defeat for a Lions team since the 1971 tourists lost the second test to the All Blacks on the same Christchurch ground and ended an unbeaten run of thirty-nine matches for the Lions. It was during the Junior All Blacks game that the famous 'Mudman' image of Fran Cotton, waiting for the ball at a line-out while caked head-to-toe in mud, was taken. Captured by Colorsport's Colin Elsey, it became one of the iconic images of rugby union.

On their way home, in August 1977, the Lions stopped off to play the Fiji for the first time and suffered their fifth defeat of the tour, Fiji winning 25–21.

A team selected from the Lions touring party played one further match, against the Barbarians at Twickenham on 10 September 1977, to mark the Silver Jubilee of Queen Elizabeth II. The Lions won by 23-14 in front of a capacity crowd, having led 15–0 at half-time.

Squad
The touring party as originally announced contained 17 players from Wales (including the as-yet uncapped Elgan Rees and Brynmor Williams), 5 from England, 5 from Scotland and 3 from Ireland. Geoff Wheel had to withdraw on medical advice before the touring party left and was replaced by Moss Keane. Roger Uttley aggravated a back injury at the get-together prior to leaving and was subsequently replaced by Jeff Squire. Bill Beaumont, Charlie Faulkner and Alun Lewis joined the tour party later in New Zealand as replacements – Lewis never played international rugby for Wales.

Several senior players made themselves unavailable to tour.

Management

 Manager George Burrell (Scotland)
 Coach John Dawes (Wales)

Backs

 Phil Bennett (Llanelli and Wales) Captain
 John D Bevan (Aberavon and Wales)
 David Burcher (Newport and Wales)
 Gareth Evans (Newport and Wales)
 Steve Fenwick (Bridgend and Wales)
 Mike Gibson (North of Ireland FC and Ireland)
 Bruce Hay (Boroughmuir and Scotland)
 Andy Irvine (Heriot's FP and Scotland)
 Alun Lewis (Cambridge University and London Welsh) 
 Ian McGeechan (Headingley and Scotland)
 Dougie Morgan (Stewart's Melville FP and Scotland)
 Elgan Rees (Neath) 
 Peter Squires (Harrogate and England)
 Brynmor Williams (Cardiff) 
 J.J. Williams (Llanelli and Wales)

Forwards

 Bill Beaumont (Fylde and England)
 Gordon Brown (West of Scotland and Scotland)
 Terry Cobner (Pontypool and Wales)
 Fran Cotton (Sale and England)
 Willie Duggan (Blackrock College and Ireland)
 Trefor Evans (Swansea and Wales)
 Charlie Faulkner (Pontypool and Wales)
 Nigel Horton (Moseley and England)
 Moss Keane (Lansdowne and Ireland)
 Allan Martin (Aberavon and Wales)
 Tony Neary (Broughton Park and England)
 Philip Orr (Old Wesley and Ireland)
 Graham Price (Pontypool and Wales)
 Derek Quinnell (Llanelli and Wales)
 Jeff Squire (Newport and Wales)
 Peter Wheeler (Leicester and England)
 Clive Williams (Aberavon and Wales)
 Bobby Windsor (Pontypool and Wales)

 Elgan Rees, Brynmor Williams and Alun Lewis were uncapped at the time of the 1977 tour; Rees and Williams were subsequently capped by Wales.

Results

Test matches

First Test

NEW ZEALAND; Colin Farrell, Bryan Williams, Bruce Robertson, Bill Osborne, Grant Batty, Duncan Robertson, Sid Going, Brad Johnstone, Tane Norton (c), Kent Lambert, Andy Haden, Frank Oliver, Kevin Eveleigh, Ian Kirkpatrick, Lawrie Knight

LIONS; Irvine, Squires, Fenwick, McGeechan, J. J. Williams, Bennett (c), B. Williams, Orr, Windsor, Price, Martin, Keane, Cobner, T. Evans, Duggan

Second Test

NEW ZEALAND; Colin Farrell, Bryan Williams, Bill Osborne, Lyn Jaffray, Mark Taylor, Doug Bruce, Sid Going, Brad Johnstone, Tane Norton (c), Billy Bush, Andy Haden, Frank Oliver, Kevin Eveleigh, Ian Kirkpatrick, Lawrie Knight

LIONS; Irvine, J. J. Williams, Fenwick, McGeechan, G. Evans, Bennett (c), B. Williams, Cotton, Wheeler, Price, Beaumont, Brown, Cobner, Quinnell, Duggan

Third Test

NEW ZEALAND; Bevan Wilson, Bryan Williams, Bruce Robertson, Bill Osborne, Brian Ford, Doug Bruce, Lyn Davis, John McEldowney, Tane Norton (c), Billy Bush, Andy Haden, Frank Oliver, Graham Mourie, Ian Kirkpatrick, Lawrie Knight

LIONS; Irvine, J. J. Williams (rep McGeechan), Burcher, Fenwick, G. Evans, Bennett (c), B. Williams (rep Morgan), Cotton, Wheeler, Price, Beaumont, Brown, Cobner, Quinnell, Duggan

Fourth Test

NEW ZEALAND; Bevan Wilson, Bryan Williams, Bruce Robertson, Bill Osborne, Brian Ford (rep Mark Taylor), Doug Bruce, Lyn Davis, John McEldowney (rep Billy Bush), Tane Norton (c), Kent Lambert, Andy Haden, Frank Oliver, Graham Mourie, Ian Kirkpatrick, Lawrie Knight

LIONS; Irvine, Rees, Fenwick, McGeechan, G. Evans, Bennett (c), Morgan, Cotton, Wheeler, Price, Beaumont, Brown, Neary, Squire, Duggan

vs Fiji

FIJI; Kemueli Musunamasi, Joape Kaunikoro, Senitiki Nasave, Qele Ratu, Wame Gavidi, Pio Bosco Tikoisuva (c), Samisoni Viriviri, Josefa Rauto, Atonio Racika, Nimilote Ratudina, Ilaitia Tuisese, Ilisoni Taoba, Rupeni Qaraniqio, Vuata Narisia, Viliame Ratudradra

LIONS; Irvine, G. Evans, McGeechan, Burcher, Bennett (c), Bevan, Lewis, Faulkner, Windsor, Price, Beaumont, Martin, Neary, T. Evans (rep Brown), Squire

Bibliography

References

External links

1977
1977 rugby union tours
Rugby union tours of Fiji
1977 in New Zealand rugby union
1976–77 in British rugby union
1977 in Fijian sport
1976–77 in Irish rugby union